"Bangun Pemudi Pemuda" is an Indonesian patriotic song which was created by Alfred Simanjuntak, and to this day the song is still echoed, as in every celebration of Independence on 17 August and Youth Pledge on 28 October.

History 
The melody of  Bangun Pemudi Pemuda  was taken from the school march of the Sekolah Rakyat Sempurna Indonesia (lit. the Indonesian School for the Perfection of the People), the tune of which was also composed by Simanjuntak. Simanjuntak argued that the people of Indonesia needed to experience a nascent spirit of patriotism, instead of just the six classes at the SRSI. The song's title (Pemudi-Pemuda, lit. Female Youth-Male Youth) was derived from the fact that several European languages use the fixed order of "ladies and gentlemen", incl. Dutch, and that inspired Simanjuntak to put a Pemudi in front of the Pemuda (usually the only term used in Indonesian for 'youth'.) Simanjuntak was put on a hit list by the Japanese military police as a direct result of this song, but it was never carried out, and he discovered the fact after independence.

Lyrics

Usage on Media Television as Public Service Advertisement 
Starting in year 2016, Ishadi SK given enough for work to make Public Service Advertisement from ATVSI containing National Anthem. After that, ATVSI and CNN Indonesia want to make the project of Public Service Advertisement that used the Bangun Pemudi Pemuda song, And accompanied by Judika, Joe Taslim, Susi Susanti, Duta Sheila On 7, and friends as the Talent Player. The National Anthem that makes Ishadi SK was known by public and Television Station Viewers. 
The song Bangun pemudi pemuda was singing by All Star Artists, Actors and Badminton Athlete (Starring Judika, Joe Taslim, Glenn Fredly (Alm), Susi Susanti, Alan Budikusuma, Marcell, Duta Sheila On 7, HIVI) which used as Public Service Advertisement by ATVSI since 2016 Was broadcasting by National TV Stations (RCTI, SCTV, Indosiar, MNCTV, ANTV, Metro TV, Trans TV, Trans7, Global TV & tvOne) and the ending was Ayo Bangkit Untuk Indonesia Gemilang (Let's Arise For A Great Indonesia).

See also

 Indonesia Raya

References

Indonesian patriotic songs